Safe conduct, safe passage, or letters of transit, is the situation in time of international conflict or war where one state, a party to such conflict, issues to a person (usually an enemy state's subject) a pass or document to allow the enemy alien to traverse its territory without harassment, bodily harm, or fear of death. Safe conduct is only granted in exceptional circumstances. It may be given to an enemy to allow retreat under surrender terms, or for a meeting to negotiate; to a stateless person; or to somebody who for some reason would normally not be able to pass. A vanquished enemy can also be given, or offered quarter, i.e. be spared, be promised or guaranteed mercy.

The term 'safe conduct' is also used to mean the document authorizing this security.

In Islamic law, safe conduct or pledge of safety (amān) can be granted to foreigners or dhimmi residents (musta'min) while they travel or reside in Islamic-ruled lands.

In the early Middle Ages, during some periods of Islamic control of the Holy Land, Christian pilgrims could request letters of safe conduct from a Muslim ruler allowing them to pass through their lands to Jerusalem. An example of safe conduct in the 13th century was William Wallace's possession of letters of safe conduct, which was granted to him and his army by a number of parties during the Wars of Scottish Independence. Another example of safe conduct in the 20th century was Lenin's "sealed train": a citizen of Russia, a country at war with Germany, Lenin was permitted to travel from his exile in Switzerland through Germany, without stopping, to return to Russia. It was in Germany's interest to allow this, for it was hoped that he would destabilize Russia. Another example would be the Chieu Hoi program during the Vietnam War.

References

Law of war